Abdul Bari was a squash player. He was one of the leading players in India in the 1940s. Bari was a distant cousin of brothers Hashim Khan and Azam Khan, who went on to dominate the international squash scene in the 1950s and early 1960s representing Pakistan while Bari preferred to stay in Bombay, India after the independence of India and Pakistan. He was sponsored to travel to the United Kingdom to compete in the British Open (the effective world championship of the sport at the time), where he finished runner-up in 1950 to the Egyptian player Mahmoud Karim. Two years later in 1952 he became the first Asian to become a professional coach in England when he was appointed by Junior Carlton Club in London. Bari died of a brain haemorrhage in 1954.

Career 
Bari was defeated by Karim at the 1950 British Open Squash Championships in London by a 9–3, 9–4, 9–0 margin. Bari lost to Karim again a few months later at the Scottish Championships in four-game match.

References

External links
 Article at Indian Squash Professionals website

Bari, Abdul
Pashtun people
Year of birth missing
1954 deaths